Paradise Falls is a Canadian weekly soap opera that aired on the Showcase channel. The series was set in the summer cottage community of Muskoka, Ontario. The show's premise was that the Town of Paradise Falls' cottage life was not one would expect – beneath its idyllic surface lurked scandal, murder, deceit, betrayal, steamy love affairs and political intrigue. 

The first season of the series, which consists of 52 episodes, aired on Showcase in 2001. Season 2 consisted of 26 episodes, but was not produced and aired until 2004, due to the series producers' difficulty in raising money for a second season. The third season also consisted of 26 episodes. Season 3 first aired on the American premium cable channel Here! TV starting in April 2008; the third season did not premiere on the original broadcaster Showcase channel until September 1, 2009.

Series overview

Episodes

Season 1 (2001)

Season 2 (2004)

Season 3 (2008) 
All season 3 episodes aired on Here! TV in the United States, premiering in April 2008, before they aired on Showcase in Canada, where season 3 premiered in September 2009.

References

External links
 
 

Lists of Canadian drama television series episodes